The FIBA Africa Championship 2001 was hosted by Morocco from August 4 to August 12, 2001.  The games were played in Rabat and Casablanca.  The top two countries in this FIBA Africa Championship earned the two berths allocated to Africa for the 2002 FIBA World Championship in the United States. Angola won the tournament, the country's 6th African championship, by beating Algeria 78-68 in the final.  Both teams qualified for the 2002 FIBA World Championship.

Draw

Squads

Preliminary round

Group A

Day 1

Day 2

Day 3

Day 4

Day 5

Group B

Day 1

Day 2

Day 3

Day 4

Day 5

Knockout stage

Classification Stage

Final standings

Angola and Algeria qualified for the 2002 FIBA World Championship in the United States.

All tournament team
 G  Miguel Lutonda
 G  Ali Bouziane
 F  Edmar Victoriano
 F  Ali El Amri
 C  Haytham Darwish

Statistical leaders

Points

Rebounds

Assists

See also
 2000 FIBA Africa Clubs Champions Cup

External links
 FIBA Archive

 
AfroBasket
2001 in Moroccan sport
2001 in African basketball
International basketball competitions hosted by Morocco
August 2001 sports events in Africa